Steve Ryan (born February 15, 1949 in San Diego, California) is an American author who specializes in the creation of games and puzzles. Ryan is also a television game show historian and creator. Ryan was a long-standing staff member of Goodson-Todman Productions and Mark Goodson Productions, where he created the concept for the game show Blockbusters. Ryan also created the rebus puzzles for the game show Classic Concentration. He was also a writer and creator of puzzles for the game shows Body Language, Catch Phrase, Password Plus and Trivia Trap.

Lottery games
As senior games executive at Goodson's lottery division, Steve created games with million-dollar payoffs for many state and international lottery game shows including: The Big Spin for California, Bingo-Lotto for Lithuania Lottery, Bonus Bonanza for Massachusetts Lottery, A Chance de Ouro for Brazil Lottery, Flamingo Fortune for Florida Lottery, Illinois Luckiest for Illinois Lottery, Instant Riches for Illinois Lottery, New York Wired for New York Lottery, Powerball: The Game Show for Multi-State Lottery, Second Chance Sweepstakes for Ohio Lottery, Telelotto for Estonia Lottery, Win'n Spin for South Africa Lottery, Zama Zama for South Africa Lottery, and 25th Anniversary Game Show for Pennsylvania Lottery. Some of his many game creations for these lottery shows include “Beach Ball,” “Camelot’s Riches,” “Capsize,” “Coney Island Coaster,” “Force Field,” “Gold Rush,” “High Roller,” “Knockout,” "Mismatch," “Niagara,” “PowerBall Express,” “Skyscraper,” “Splashdown,” “Steeple Chase,” “Thunderball,” “Treasure Quest,” “Vortex,” “Wrecking Ball,” and “Zero Gravity.”

Puzzles
Ryan is recognized as one of the world's most prolific creators of puzzles with thousands of puzzles to his credit. He began his career as a puzzle columnist at Copley News Service where he created several puzzle and game features for readers across America and other English speaking countries. Those features include “Puzzles & Posers” which is a mixed grill of cerebral calisthenics designed to explore player's powers of reason, logic and ingenuity, and “Zig-Zag” the original word maze-puzzle which challenges players to search for words from given categories. Both features have run non-stop from 1973 and 1975 (respectively) to current day. Both of Ryan's features have the distinction of being Copley News Service's longest running features in the history of the news organization. Creators Syndicate absorbed both features when Copley News Service sold in 2008.

Books
Dozens of Steve Ryan books have evolved from his puzzle features and his work in television. Steve self-published his first book in 1975 titled “Puzzle Cards.”  His “Grape Vine” puzzle in that book is recognized as the earliest known puzzle to utilize what is known as the “freeway rule” within a genre of puzzles known as mazes-with-rules as referenced in SuperMazes by Robert Abbott.

Worldwide, many Steve Ryan puzzle books have been translated and published for Chinese, Russian, Czechoslovakian, French, Dutch, Portuguese, Spanish, Indian, Malaysian and Indonesian markets.

Ryan is also co-author of The Encyclopedia of TV Game Shows, the most comprehensive book of its kind. This encyclopedia is often referred to as the Bible of the game show industry. As a reference book it documents every game show that has ever appeared in a national market whether it be in cable, syndication or network. Three updated editions have been published to date. The book has been used as a Jeopardy! answer: The answer was, "'Beat the Odds,' 'Music Bingo' and 'Fast Draw' are entries in an encyclopedia of these by Schwartz, Ryan & Wostbrock." A contestant came in with the correct question, “What are game shows?”

Magazines
In addition to the books authored by Steve Ryan, his work has appeared in such magazines as Games, Nick, Nickelodeon, Nick Toons and World of Puzzles in the U.S. and Games & Puzzles in the United Kingdom. Will Shortz, while editor at Games magazine, acknowledged the work of Steve Ryan as some of the best in the world of puzzles.

Puzzle creations by Steve Ryan have been utilized by the Game's National Puzzle Test. His puzzles always rate as visually intriguing, with a high rate of contestants attempting to solve, yet with a lower than normal rate of success. That's the secret behind most Steve Ryan creations: visually stimulating and mentally captivating. A basic Steve Ryan philosophy has always been to make a puzzle appear easy to solve, yet quite engaging to conjure the solution.

Box games
Stix & Stones, a box game created by Steve Ryan, received the Parents' Choice 2010 Award for new game. After years of challenging fans to solve his brainteasers with pencils, players are asked to put down those pencils and grab a handful of sticks and stones to create images using the fewest possible number of sticks and stones. It's a game that encourages creative thinking with little or no artistic skill required. Ryan likes to say, “If you could play against Pablo Picasso, all you’d have to do is out think him because he has to use the same sticks and stones as you do to create his image."

Career
As a child, Ryan was inspired by the mathematical recreations of Henry Dudeney and Sam Loyd. Later, while studying Art and Design at California State University Long Beach, Steve polished his skills to illustrate his own puzzle and game creations. And, now, after decades of passionate work, Ryan's word games, number quizzes, problems in logic, devious dissections, scrambled letters, mazes-with-rules, mathematical recreations and more continue to inspire readers to sharpen their pencils and sharpen their wits. Many of his fans know him as the Picasso of Puzzles and Gauguin of Games.

Published works
 Brain Busters
 Challenging Pencil Puzzlers
 Classic Concentration
 Clever Lunchbox Puzzles
 The Encyclopedia of TV Game Shows by David Schwartz, Steve Ryan and Fred Wostbrock
 The Encyclopedia of TV Game Shows, second edition by David Schwartz, Steve Ryan and Fred Wostbrock
 The Encyclopedia of TV Game Shows, third edition by David Schwartz, Steve Ryan and Fred Wostbrock
 The Giant Book of Math Fun, edited by Sterling Publishing
 The Giant Book of Puzzles, edited by Sterling Publishing
 Great Rebus Puzzles
 IQ Boosters
 The Little Giant Encyclopedia of Mensa Mind Teasers, edited by Peter Gordon
 The Little Giant Book Of Brain Teasers, edited by Sterling Publishing
 Lunchbox Puzzles
 Mighty Mini Rhyming Picture Puzzles
 Mind-Bending Maze Puzzles, edited by Heather Dickson
 Mystifying Math Puzzles
 Our Puzzlerama
 Pencil Puzzlers
 Puzzle Cards
 Puzzles Posers & Pastimes
 Rhyming Picture Puzzles
 Sit & Solve Pencil Puzzles
 Sit & Solve Travel Math Puzzles
 Test Your Math IQ
 Test Your Puzzle IQ
 Test Your Word Play IQ
 The Ultimate TV Game Show Book by Steve Ryan and Fred Wostbrock

References

Sources 
 Abbott, Robert (1997). SuperMazes, p IX-X. Prima Publishing.
 “Student at LB State develops puzzles”, Community Advocate, January 17, 1973
 Jan Worth, “Puzzle Master”, Daily Pilot, November 6, 1974
 Jeanne Potter, “He Creates Fun and Games”, The New-Post, October 16, 1974
 Media Browse, “TV Game Show Guide”, Television/Radio Age, September 19, 1988
 Amy Goldstein, “Concentrated Challenges”, Games Magazine, June 1993, p24-25
 “From The Best New Books”, Games Magazine, August 1993, p28
 Peter Gordon, “Jigsaw Puzzle Rebus”, Games Magazine, February 1993
 “The Year’s Best Puzzle Books”, World Of Puzzles, November 1994
 “From The Best New Books”, Games Magazine, August 1992, p27
 John Hardy, “OC Fireman Pursues Puzzling Hobby”, The Register, January 7, 1975
 “Where, Wolf”, Nickelodeon Magazine, October 1999, p47
 “Obstacles to the Oval Office”, Nickelodeon Magazine, November 2000, p76-77
 “Turkey Trot”, Nickelodeon Magazine, November 2001, p76
 “From Fear To There”, Nickelodeon Magazine, October 2002, p64-65
 “Jellyfish Jam”, Nick Magazine, May 2003, p5
 “Gopher It”, Nickelodeon Magazine, March 2004, p18-19
 “Laugh Tracks”, Nick Magazine, Summer 2005, p17
 “Escape From Desert Island”, Nick Magazine, May 2006, p12-13
 “Cold Play”, Nick Magazine, August 2007, p14-15

External links
 Steve Ryan Games
 List of California State University, Long Beach people

1949 births
Living people
American writers